Marco Giancarlo Andreolli (born 10 June 1986) is a retired Italian professional footballer who played as a centre-back.

Club career

Padova and Internazionale
Andreolli began playing with Padova's youth system before being signed by Inter in 2003. He made his Serie A debut against Reggina in May 2005, aged 18, and made two more appearances in the 2005–06 Serie A.

On 29 November 2006, during a Coppa Italia match against Messina, Andreolli scored his first professional goal in the 6th minute. Inter won this game 4–0.

Roma
On 27 July 2007 he signed with Roma on a co-ownership deal as part of the agreement that brought Cristian Chivu to Inter, he was tagged as €3M for half of the rights. He spent the second half of the 2007–08 season on loan to Vicenza in Serie B.

His transfer was later fully acquired by Roma during the 2008 summer transfer window, for free, and Andreolli was subsequently loaned out to newly promoted Serie B side Sassuolo for the entire 2008–09 season in order to gain first team experience.

On 22 October 2009, he scored a 93th-minute equaliser for Roma against Fulham in a UEFA Europa League group stage fixture.

Chievo
On 24 August 2010, Andreolli completed a transfer to fellow Serie A side Chievo to gain more playing time. As he only had one-year left in his contract, he was sold for €800,000.

With the number 3, Andreolli made his competitive debut five days after the transfer in the opening matchday by starting in a 2–1 win against Catania. On 24 January 2011, Inter bought back half of Andreolli's registration rights from Chievo, for €885,000. He also returned to Chievo on loan. However, on 22 June he was sold back to Chievo for €500,000. In the same window, Michele Rigione joined Inter for €500,000 outright.

Andreolli spent two more seasons with Chievo before returning to Inter again in 2013 as a free agent.

Return to Internazionale
On 11 May 2013 it was announced, that Andreolli would move back to Inter on a free transfer. He was also eligible to one of the four club-trained players in the squad for UEFA competitions, otherwise Inter would be force to vacant the quota and the squad would be reduced as a consequence.

He made his return debut on 3 November, playing the last 9 minutes of 3–0 away win against Udinese at Stadio Friuli. On 18 May 2014, Andreolli scored his only goal of the season, opening a 2–1 loss away to Chievo.

On 11 January 2015, in Inter's 3–1 home win over Genoa, Andreolli captained Inter for the first time in his career, playing full-90 minutes in the process. In the post-match interview, Andreolli said that "it was a dream come true" to captain Inter at San Siro.

On 31 August 2015, after totalling just 10 league appearances in two years at Inter, Andreolli moved abroad for the first time, being loaned to Spain's Sevilla for the upcoming campaign. Inter also failed to qualify to the European stage that season, thus Andreolli was not require to fill UEFA quota.

Due to injury to Adil Rami, he made his La Liga debut on 11 September, partnering Timothée Kolodziejczak in a 1–1 draw at Levante UD. On 21 November, he tore his Achilles tendon in a 2–0 loss to Real Sociedad, putting him out for the rest of the season.

On 30 June 2017, Andreolli become a free agent after Inter decided not to extend his contract.

Cagliari
After becoming a free agent, on 7 July 2017, Andreolli joined Cagliari by signing a two-year contract.

Return to Chievo
On 31 January 2019, Andreolli signed to Chievo.

International career
Andreolli played from 2006 to 2009 for the Italy U-21 national team under coach Pierluigi Casiraghi.

Personal life
In an interview in June 2006, Andreolli stated that he was a fan of Internazionale since he was a kid. He also said that he grew up idolising ex-Inter defenders Riccardo Ferri and Giuseppe Bergomi, but added that his favourite player was Marco van Basten.

Career statistics
Updated 5 June 2019

Honours
Inter Reserves
 Coppa Italia Primavera: 2005–06

Inter
 Coppa Italia: 2005–06
 Supercoppa Italiana: 2006
 Serie A: 2005–06, 2006–07
Italy U21
UEFA European Under-21 Championship bronze:2009

References

External links
Internazionale official profile
 FIGC 

1986 births
Living people
Sportspeople from the Province of Piacenza
Italian footballers
Italy youth international footballers
Italy under-21 international footballers
Association football central defenders
Inter Milan players
Calcio Padova players
A.S. Roma players
L.R. Vicenza players
U.S. Sassuolo Calcio players
A.C. ChievoVerona players
Sevilla FC players
Cagliari Calcio players
Serie A players
Serie B players
La Liga players
Italian expatriate footballers
Expatriate footballers in Spain
Italian expatriate sportspeople in Spain
Footballers from Emilia-Romagna